Algoma East was a federal electoral district in Ontario, Canada, that was represented in the House of Commons of Canada from 1904 to 1968. It was created in 1903 from parts of Algoma riding.

It initially consisted of the territorial district of Manitoulin and the part of the territorial district of Algoma lying east of a line drawn from south to north along the limit between the townships of Lefroy and Plummer Additional and due north to the northern limit of Algoma.

In 1904, the territorial district of Manitoulin was transferred out of the riding.

In 1914, it was redefined to consist of the eastern part of the territorial district of Algoma, excluding those parts included in Timiskaming, the western part of the territorial district of Sudbury, and the territorial district of Manitoulin

In 1933, it was redefined to consist of the territorial district of Manitoulin, and the parts of the territorial districts of Algoma and Sudbury.

The electoral district was abolished in 1966 when it was redistributed between Algoma, Nickel Belt and Timmins—Chapleau ridings.

Its last, longest-serving, and highest-profile MP was Lester Pearson of the Liberal Party, who was Prime Minister of Canada from 1963 to 1968.

Members of Parliament
This riding elected the following members of the House of Commons of Canada:

Election results

|}

|}

|}

|}

|}

|}

|}

|}

|}

|}

|}

|}

|}

|}

|}

|}

|}

|}

|}

External links
Riding history from the Library of Parliament

Former federal electoral districts of Ontario